Talk America, Inc. v. Michigan Bell Telephone Co., 564 U.S. 50 (2011), was a United States Supreme Court case in which the Court held that the Federal Communications Commission (FCC) had advanced a reasonable interpretation of its regulations in a dispute with AT&T.

See also 
 List of United States Supreme Court cases, volume 564

References

External links
 

2011 in United States case law
United States Supreme Court cases
United States Supreme Court cases of the Roberts Court
Legal history of Michigan